|}
{| class="collapsible collapsed" cellpadding="0" cellspacing="0" style="clear:right; float:right; text-align:center; font-weight:bold;" width="280px"
! colspan="3" style="border:1px solid black; background-color: #77DD77;" | Also Ran

The 2008 Epsom Derby was a horse race which took place at Epsom Downs on Saturday 7 June 2008. It was the 229th running of the Derby, and it was won by New Approach. The winner was ridden by Kevin Manning and trained by Jim Bolger. The pre-race favourite Casual Conquest finished third.

Race details
 Sponsor: Vodafone
 Winner's prize money: £802,444
 Going: Good
 Number of runners: 16
 Winner's time: 2m 36.50s

Full result

* The distances between the horses are shown in lengths or shorter – shd = short-head† Trainers are based in Great Britain unless indicated

Winner's details
Further details of the winner, New Approach:

 Foaled: 18 February 2005 in Ireland
 Sire: Galileo; Dam: Park Express (Ahonoora)
 Owner: Princess Haya of Jordan
 Breeder: Lodge Park Stud
 Rating in 2008 World Thoroughbred Rankings: 130

Form analysis

Two-year-old races
Notable runs by the future Derby participants as two-year-olds in 2007.

 New Approach – 1st Tyros Stakes, 1st Futurity Stakes, 1st National Stakes, 1st Dewhurst Stakes
 Alessandro Volta – 1st Eyrefield Stakes
 Rio de la Plata – 1st Vintage Stakes, 2nd National Stakes, 1st Prix Jean-Luc Lagardère, 4th Dewhurst Stakes
 Tajaaweed – 10th Racing Post Trophy
 Curtain Call – 2nd Futurity Stakes, 1st Beresford Stakes, 5th Racing Post Trophy
 Frozen Fire – 8th Racing Post Trophy
 King of Rome – 11th Racing Post Trophy
 Alan Devonshire – 3rd Silver Tankard Stakes

The road to Epsom
Early-season appearances in 2008 and trial races prior to running in the Derby.

 New Approach – 2nd 2,000 Guineas, 2nd Irish 2,000 Guineas
 Tartan Bearer – 1st Dante Stakes
 Casual Conquest – 1st Derrinstown Stud Derby Trial
 Doctor Fremantle – 1st Chester Vase
 Washington Irving – 2nd Derrinstown Stud Derby Trial
 Alessandro Volta – 4th Ballysax Stakes, 1st Lingfield Derby Trial
 Rio de la Plata – 2nd Poule d'Essai des Poulains
 Tajaaweed – 1st Dee Stakes
 Bouguereau – 7th Derby Italiano
 Curtain Call – 1st Intercasino.co.uk Conditions Stakes
 Frozen Fire – 2nd Dante Stakes
 King of Rome – 5th Ballysax Stakes, 2nd Lingfield Derby Trial
 Alan Devonshire – 4th Lingfield Derby Trial
 Kandahar Run – 2nd Feilden Stakes, 1st Newmarket Stakes

Subsequent Group 1 wins
Group 1 / Grade I victories after running in the Derby.

 New Approach – Irish Champion Stakes (2008), Champion Stakes (2008)
 Casual Conquest – Tattersalls Gold Cup (2009)
 Frozen Fire – Irish Derby (2008)

Subsequent breeding careers
Leading progeny of participants in the 2008 Epsom Derby.

Sires of Classic winners
New Approach (1st)
 Dawn Approach - 1st 2000 Guineas Stakes (2013)
 Talent - 1st Epsom Oaks (2013)
 Masar - 1st Epsom Derby (2018)
 Winters Moon - 3rd Fillies' Mile (2014) dam of Earthlight (1st Middle Park Stakes 2019)

Other Stallions
Rio De La Plata (7th) - Settle For Bay (1st Royal Hunt Cup 2018) - Exported to SwedenTartan Bearer (2nd) - Exported to New ZealandDoctor Fremantle (4th) - Exported to VenezuelaTajaaweed (8th) - Exported to Saudi ArabiaFrozen Fire (11th) - Minor jumps winnersKandahar Run (14th) - Minor flat and jumps winnersBashkirov (15th) - Minor flat and jumps runners

References
 
 Epsom 16:00 – Result Vodafone Derby (Group 1) Sporting Life, 7 June 2008

Epsom Derby
 2008
Epsom Derby
Epsom Derby
2000s in Surrey